Knowless (born Jeanne d’Arc Ingabire Butera) is a Rwandan singer. She has one husband called clement and they have two girls children. Butera writes many of her own songs. Her songs touch on such themes as romantic relationships, societal issues and daily life.

History

Early years and background
Jeanne d’Arc Ingabire Butera was born in Ruhango District, is the wife of Ishimwe Clement .the only child of Jean-Marie Vianney Butera and Marie Claire Uyambaje, who are both deceased. Her mother was formerly the lead singer in a local Seventh-day Adventist church choir. Butera attended ESCAF primary school in Nyamirambo, APARUDE secondary school in Ruhango and APACE secondary school in Kigali with a focus on computer sciences and management. As a teenager she sang in the local choir. In 2012 she began to pursue a university degree at Kigali Institute of Science and Technology.

In 2019, she graduated with an MBA at the Oklahoma Christian University. She is a mother of two girls named Or & Inzora Butera.

Musical career
Knowless released her debut album, Komeza, in December 2011. Her second album, Uwo Ndiwe, was released in March 2013.  Knowless is managed under the label Kina Music.

She has performed throughout Rwanda and in neighboring countries, including Uganda, and has collaborated with numerous artists, including Rwandans Danny, Paccy, Ciney, Jay Polly, Kamichi and Urban Boyz, and Ugandan group Vampos. She has named Belgium-based Rwandan musician Cecile Kayirebwa and American R&B singer-songwriter Brandy Norwood as inspirations. in 2021 she released new album called Inzora.

Awards
Knowless won "Best New Artiste" in the 2010 Salax Awards competition. In August 2013, she took third place in the annual Primus Guma Guma Super Star talent competition, held at Amahoro Stadium. In March 2013 she won her second Salax Award, this time in the category of "Best Female Artist".

In 2013, Knowless was one of three Rwandan acts to perform at the "Rwanda Day" event held in London.
in 2015, Knowless Butera won the Primus Gumma Gumma Superstar 5th Edition, and she is the first woman to win such a competition. She currently working in Kina Music House was also contain Christopher Muneza until 2022.

References

Living people
1990 births
Rwandan women singers
People from Ruhango District